CYP27A1 is a gene encoding a cytochrome P450 oxidase, and is commonly known as sterol 27-hydroxylase.  This enzyme is located in many different tissues where it is found within the mitochondria.  It is most prominently involved in the biosynthesis of bile acids.

Function 
CYP27A1 participates in the degradation of cholesterol to bile acids in both the classic and acidic pathways. It is the initiating enzyme in the acidic pathway to bile acids, yielding oxysterols by introducing a hydroxyl group to the carbon at the 27 position in cholesterol. In the acidic pathway, it produces 27-hydroxycholesterol from cholesterol whereas in the classic or neutral pathway, it produces 3β-hydroxy-5-cholestenoic acid.

While CYP27A1 is present in many different tissues, its function in these tissues is largely uncharacterized. In macrophages, 27-hydroxycholesterol generated by this enzyme may be helpful against the production of inflammatory factors associated with cardiovascular disease.

Clinical significance 
Mutations in CYP27A1 are associated with cerebrotendineous xanthomatosis, a rare lipid storage disease.

Inhibitors of CYP27A1 may be effective as adjuvants in the treatment of ER-positive breast cancer due to inhibition of the production of 27-hydroxycholesterol (which has estrogenic actions and stimulates the growth of ER-positive breast cancer cells). Some marketed drugs that have been identified as CYP27A1 inhibitors include anastrozole, fadrozole, bicalutamide, dexmedetomidine, ravuconazole, and posaconazole.

Interactive pathway map

See also
 Steroidogenic enzyme
CYP27 family

References

Further reading

External links 
 GeneReviews/NCBI/NIH/UW entry on Cerebrotendinous Xanthomatosis
 
 

27